Przemysław Kocot (born 31 January 1986 in Jelenia Góra) is a Polish footballer (defender) who currently plays for KS Karkonosze Jelenia Góra.

Career

Club
He was released from Zagłębie Lubin on 1 June 2011.

In July 2011, he joined KS Polkowice.

Ahead of the 2019-20 season, Kocot returned to KS Karkonosze Jelenia Góra.

References

External links
 
 

1986 births
Living people
Górnik Polkowice players
Zagłębie Lubin players
KS Polkowice players
Warta Poznań players
Flota Świnoujście players
ŁKS Łódź players
Znicz Pruszków players
Ekstraklasa players
I liga players
II liga players
III liga players
Polish footballers
People from Jelenia Góra
Sportspeople from Lower Silesian Voivodeship
Association football defenders